The second edition of Euro Winners Cup was a beach soccer tournament in Catania, Italy, from 3 – 8 June 2014. The tournament brought together club champions of many domestic beach soccer leagues across Europe, almost in the same vein as the UEFA Champions League.

Participating teams
Twenty-five teams from 22 countries confirmed their participation in the tournament:

 Catania BS (Host team)
 Milano BS (Host Country National champion 2013) 
 AS Terracina BS  (Host Country National Runner-up 2013) 
 Lokomotiv Moscow (2013 Euro Winners Cup Champion)
 BSC Kristall
 Aluminios Sotelo
 AO Kefallinia
 Artur Music
 FC BATE Borisov
 BS Bohemians 1905
 CS Djoker - Tornado Chișinău
 "Falfala" Kfar Qassem
 Goldwin Plus Bodon FC
 Grembach Łódź
 Kreiss
 Marseille Beach Team
 MFC Spartak 2012 Varna
 Rostocker Robben
 Sable Dancers Bern
 SC Braga
 Seferihisar CittaSlow
 SK Augur Enemat
 Portsmouth BS
 Ushkyn-Iskra
 Egmond BS

Group stage
According to the draw realized on May 26, teams were divided in a group stage with four groups of 4 and  three groups of 3, then the two best ranked sides of each group, and the best overall two third-ranked sides will advance to the round of 16.

Group A

Group B

Group C

Group D

Group E

Group F

Group G

Play-off

Bracket

5th–8th places

Winners

Awards

Final standings

See also
Beach soccer
Beach Soccer Worldwide

References

External links
Beach Soccer Worldwide

Euro Winners Cup
Euro
2014
Sport in Catania
2014 in beach soccer